The 1975 Idaho State Bengals football team represented the Idaho State University as a member of the Big Sky Conference during the 1975 NCAA Division II football season. Led by Bob Griffin in the fourth and final season as head coach, the Bengals, compiled an overall record of 7–3 with a mark of 4–2 in conference play, tying for second place in the Big Sky. Idaho State played home games at the ASISU Minidome in Pocatello, Idaho.

Schedule

References

Idaho State
Idaho State Bengals football seasons
Idaho State football